Ashley's Worlds was a mid-1990s radio comedy series in 100 episodes that was broadcast on 26 radio stations and described by its creators Andrew Dubber and Belinda Todd as a "cartoon for radio".

Plot 
Domestic cat Ashley is transported, or "magicked", into the kingdom of Catatonia, a world completely run by anthropomorphic cats, where he is mistaken for a spy and is thrown into the dungeon of the royal castle. He escapes with the uncouth scrapper Bishop and together with their self-proclaimed hostage Tobias they seek an audience with the princess Tabitha hoping to resolve Ashley's predicament.

The four set out to seek for the ruins of Cataract. Along their journey they meet (or fight) a band of pi-rats, the giant hariry-legged giant spider Catawampus, the Felines for Freedom fighting force, Drongoon the scariest scaliest son-of-a-dragon that ever breathe fire, and Ethel the alchemist.

Finally they reach the ruins of Cataract and discover the lost city of Catlantis, a subterrainian treasure chest of ancient relics and long-forgotten magic and the inner sanctum of the immortal Eternity, the last of the ancient one.

Cast 

Craig Parker as Ashley, a spoiled cat used to a nice patch of sunshine to sleep in and a house full of humans to pander to his every need. Prior to his transportation to Catatonia, his most unpleasant experience involved an unscheduled trip to the vet and a cold thermometer, and his most dangerous escapade was a slow flick of the tail coupled with a rather faster closing of the fridge door. In Catatonia, Ashley is a fish out of water.
Carl Bland as Bishop, a fierce looking criminal cat eager to whip out his card which reads "Bishop the bloodthirsty: specializing in assassinations, intimidations and small wars. No job too messy." Ashley's unusual behavior first has Bishop suspect Ashley is "a crazy".
David Weatherley as Tobias Pussinbootle the 14th, a plump and ageing "aristo-cat" of the noble Pussinbootle family.
Belinda Todd as Tabitha, the visually impaired and self-centered princess and ruler of Catatonia whose missing father, the king, was obsessed with discovering the lost city of Cataract, built by the magically adept ancients.
Merv Smith as The Strange Old Cat, and most additional characters.
Beryl Te Wiata as Eternity (guest appearance)
Ilona Rodgers and Emmeline Hawthorne also made guest appearances.

Format and style 
The series was described by its creators Andrew Dubber and Belinda Todd as a "cartoon for radio".

Each episode of 3–5 minutes opens with a monologue musing on life as a cat, often interwoven with a recap of events in previous episodes. The comedy in both the monologue and dialogue builds on puns and some jokes having comical associations with anything related to cats or the felidae family.

Production 

The series was recorded at Progressive Studios in Anzac Ave with the assistance of Tim Gummer and Cameron Fisher. Dubber produced, edited and did the sound design using the Hannah-Barbera sound effects library.
Dubber and Todd discussed characters and storylines and Todd did the writing; Creating the narrative arc, the dialogue and the comedy.

On average, each 3–5 minutes episode took around 16 hours to make. About a quarter of that was recording the dialog and the rest was digital editing.

Dubber later said that the show jumped the shark towards the end, "but they kept paying us to make it, so we kept making it after the wheels had fallen off a bit."

Producers Andrew Dubber and Belinda Todd would later produce the radio series Claybourne in 1998, which was geared towards a more mature audience.

Distribution 
The show was part of a syndicated compilation show for kids called Buckeroo that was broadcast on Sunday mornings on 26 radio stations in New Zealand.

In January 2005, Dubber announced on his blog "The Wireless" that he had registered Ashley's Worlds under a Creative Commons Licence (by-nc-sa 2.0) and seeded a torrent with the series, and in April 2020 he offered the complete sereies for download on his web page. Dubber called it a "survival strategy" and said in that "My theory is that the more people have copies of this stuff, the less likely it is to disappear forever. Digital archiving is about dissemination and propagating, not hoarding and hiding."

Episodes 

*  Episode 33 is the only episode with any acting after the end signature

Footnotes

Notes

References

External links 
Ashley's Worlds on Andrew Dubber's blog (episodes 1-100 available for download)
Ashley's Worlds on bandcamp.com (episodes 1-14 available for streaming)

Comedy radio programs
New Zealand radio programmes
Creative Commons-licensed works
Cats in popular culture
Anthropomorphic cats